100 North Main is the tallest building in Memphis, Tennessee. At 430 feet, (131m) it has 37 floors and stands bordering Adams Avenue, North Second Street, and North Main.  The building is currently totally vacant and closed to public entry.  Plans for renovation to convert the building to hotel and apartments have repeatedly failed. The building stands abandoned and fenced off as of May 2016. The building has been condemned by Shelby County Environmental Court since late 2015 when it was discovered that chunks of concrete were falling from the building's exterior walls, as well as the elevators being inoperable and the fire safety systems not being up to code or functional. It was listed on the National Register of Historic Places in 2015.

History 

Finished in 1965, 100 North Main has remained a focal point of the Memphis riverfront skyline.  The building was designed by Robert Lee Hall, the architect of Memphis' largest office building (based on square footage), Clark Tower, as well as Patterson Hall at the University of Memphis.

100 North Main is an almost identical, taller version of the 633 Building in downtown Milwaukee, Wisconsin.

Due to its proximity to various municipal buildings, 100 North Main's tenant base consisted primarily of attorneys, title companies, and various other professionals involved with government business and the courts.

In 2006, the aging office tower was priced for sale at $20 million. Due to limited demand for commercial office space in downtown Memphis, much office space began to decline in value. In January 2012, only 30% of the building was occupied. The building sold for $5 million in August 2013, valuing the building's  of office space at approximately $11 per square foot.

In February 2014, the building's new owners revealed plans to convert the building into apartments and a hotel at a cost of almost $100 million. Construction began in June 2014, after all remaining tenants vacated the building.

Currently, the building stands abandoned and fenced off as of May 2016. The building has been condemned by Shelby County Environmental Court since late 2015 when it was discovered that chunks of concrete were falling from the building's exterior walls, as well as the elevators being inoperable and the fire safety systems not being up to code or functional.

On January 8, 2018, the current owner of 100 North Main, New York-based Townhouse Management Co., made public plans to convert the building into a 550-room Loews Hotel with 220 apartment units.  The developer also planned to build a new, 34 story office tower on an adjacent property.

On March 9, 2021, the Downtown Memphis Commission purchased 100 North Main from Townhouse Management Co. for $12 million. As a part of the agreement, all lawsuits against Townhouse regarding the building were dropped.

Design features 
For many years, 100 North Main was crowned with a large illuminated "UP Bank" sign, visible for miles. The sign was dismantled in late 2005 due to the acquisition of Union Planters National Bank by Regions Bank.  As of April 2007, the sign had not been replaced and the tower's top cap was a blue, empty box –giving the building a somewhat abandoned appearance. Because of the "UP Bank" sign, many Memphians mistakenly believe that 100 North Main was the headquarters building of Union Planters, although the bank's actual headquarters was at 67 Madison Avenue and, later, 6200 Poplar Avenue.

The building was constructed with a revolving restaurant atop the main roof.  This restaurant operated under several different owners and names (Top of the 100 Club, Pinnacle, etc.), but is now vacant.  Behind the restaurant was a Japanese garden which closed in 1971.  A few large stones and a concrete path are all that remain of the garden today.

The base of the tower is a multilevel parking garage.  Some retail space is also accessible from street-level entrances.

In their 1986 book Memphis: An Architectural Guide, authors Eugene J. Johnson and Robert D. Russell, Jr. called 100 North Main "one of the least interesting" downtown structures.

See also
List of tallest buildings in Memphis
 National Register of Historic Places listings in Shelby County, Tennessee

References

External links
Emporis Listing of building

Skyscraper office buildings in Memphis, Tennessee
Office buildings completed in 1965
Office buildings on the National Register of Historic Places in Tennessee
National Register of Historic Places in Memphis, Tennessee
1965 establishments in Tennessee